Taylor Township is an inactive township in Shelby County, in the U.S. state of Missouri.

Taylor Township was named after President Zachary Taylor.

References

Townships in Missouri
Townships in Shelby County, Missouri